In the United States, tribal disenrollment is a process by which a Native American individual loses citizenship or the right to belong within a Native American tribe. 

Belonging in Native nations, which was historically a matter of kinship, has become increasingly legalistic. More than 80 of the 574 federally recognized tribes, in 17 states, have deployed the practice, typically for political or financial reasons. While tribal leaders assert that disenrollments are meant to correct tribal rolls and protect the integrity of the tribe, empirical data shows they are politically and economically motivated.

Article 9 of the UN Declaration on the Rights of Indigenous Peoples states: "Indigenous peoples and individuals have the right to belong to an indigenous community or nation, in accordance with the traditions and customs of the community or nation concerned." No discrimination of any kind may arise from the exercise of such a right. Article 33 of that UN states that "Indigenous peoples have the right to determine their own identity or membership in accordance with their customs and traditions." Individual and tribal rights clash in the disenrollment context.

In the United States, it is entirely up to the tribes to determine the criteria and procedures that an individual must meet and undergo to be considered for tribal membership. Most tribes do so pursuant to artificial tribal membership standards meted out by the U.S. Congress pursuant to the Indian Reorganization Act of 1934, most notably blood quantum. Between 1904 and 1919, tribal members of mixed African and Native American ancestry were disenrolled from the Chitimacha tribe of Louisiana, and their descendants have since then been denied tribal membership.

An increasing number of Native American associations urge tribes to reconsider disenrollment, or to at least ensure that any such process comports with fundamental notions of due process at law. The Association of American Indian Physicians has decried disenrollment because it "perpetuates historical trauma", resulting in "health risks", including "suicide, homicide, accidental deaths, domestic violence, child abuse and alcoholism, as well as other social problems". The National Native American Bar Association has declared it "immoral and unethical" for "any lawyer" to help tribes remove people from their rolls without an adequate process to address the rights of the individuals.

See also
Loss of citizenship
Cherokee freedmen controversy
Impact of Native American gaming
Native American recognition in the United States
Native American reservation politics
Native American self-determination
Nooksack people disenrollment controversy.
Pechanga Band of Luiseño Indians membership and disenrollment
Tribal sovereignty
Redding Rancheria

References

Native American law
Denaturalization